The 2015 Women's Twenty20 Cup, known for sponsorship reasons as the 2015 NatWest Women's Twenty20 Cup, was the 7th cricket Women's Twenty20 Cup tournament. It took place between June and August, with 38 teams taking part: 34 county teams, alongside Scotland, Ireland, Wales and Netherlands. Sussex Women won the Twenty20 Cup, achieving their second title. The tournament ran alongside the 50-over 2015 Women's County Championship.

Competition format

Teams played matches within a series of divisions with the winners of the top division being crowned the Champions. Matches were played using a Twenty20 format.

The championship worked on a points system with positions within the divisions being based on the total points. Points were awarded as follows:

Win: 4 points. 
Tie: 1 point. 
Loss: 0 points.
Abandoned/Cancelled: 1 point.

Teams 
The 2015 Women's Twenty20 Cup was divided into four divisions: Divisions One, Two and Three with nine teams each and Division Four with 11 teams, divided into three regional groups; teams in the top three divisions played each other once, and teams in Division Four played between four and six matches. The top team in each Division Four group progressed to a final group of three, with the top two being promoted.

Division One 

 Source: ECB Women's Twenty20 Cup

Division Two 

 Source: ECB Women's Twenty20 Cup

Division Three 

 Source: ECB Women's Twenty20 Cup

Division Four

Group A

 Source: ECB Women's Twenty20 Cup

Group B

 Source: ECB Women's Twenty20 Cup

Group C

 Source: ECB Women's Twenty20 Cup

Play-Off

 Source: ECB Women's Twenty20 Cup

Statistics

Most runs

Source: CricketArchive

Most wickets

Source: CricketArchive

References

Women's Twenty20 Cup
 
2015 in Scottish cricket
cricket
cricket